A garden office is an office in a garden. This is usually separate to a house, being used as a dedicated office space by a remote worker or by a home-based business. In the UK, planning permission is not normally needed for a garden office if you are only using it as a home study and if it is similar in size and construction to a garden shed. A garden office used as a home study does not need planning permission as long as it is not more than 4 metres tall for a pitched roof, at least 2 metres from the property line and does not cover more than half of the garden area. If you are running a business from your garden office it will need planning permission regardless of its size or position within the garden. This is because working at home, in the garden, can cause a problem for neighbours. The cost will depend upon the facilities and can be between £5,000 and £60,000. Internet and telephone connections may be required and this can perhaps be achieved by use of a wireless network based in the main building.

Famous users

 Philip Pullman

See also
 Garden buildings

References

3. Typical Garden Office Specification

External links
 Increasing numbers are owning and working in sheds, BBC News
 The Planning Portal is the UK Government's online planning and building regulations resource for England and Wales. The link shows a multi-screen, detailed guide for whether or not outbuildings require planning permission in England, UK.

Rooms